Diémoz is a commune in the Isère department in southeastern France.

Population

Twin towns — sister cities
Diémoz is twinned with:

  Castelnuovo Belbo, Italy (1970)

See also
Communes of the Isère department

References

Communes of Isère
Isère communes articles needing translation from French Wikipedia